RRS Discovery is a Royal Research Ship operated by the Natural Environment Research Council. The ship is the third such vessel to be built and named for the ship used by Robert Falcon Scott in his 1901-1904 expedition to the Antarctic.

Discovery was built as a replacement for the previous Discovery in the "blue ocean" research role. The ship was ordered in 2010 from the C.N.P. Freire shipyard in Vigo, Spain, and was launched in April 2012. Discovery was delivered to the NERC in the summer of 2013 for a period of sea trials prior to her planned initial deployment.

The ship is fitted with flexible laboratory spaces, allowing the laboratories to be tailored to the nature of the different scientific activities intended to take place on each cruise. Discovery is also fitted with an advanced hydroacoustic system in three major parts; a pair of major echosounders plus a hydrophone are installed in a special "blister" installation on the ship's keel, while she also carries a pair of "drop keels" containing more echosounders, hydrophones and CCTV cameras. Discovery is also capable of operating the National Oceanography Centre's ROUV Isis.

References

External links
Skipsteknisk AS Design ST-344
RRS Discovery
Time lapse video of Discovery's construction

Natural Environment Research Council
Oceanographic instrumentation
Research vessels of the United Kingdom
2012 ships
Ships built in Vigo, Spain